Parliamentary elections were held in Sudan on 27 February and 8 March 1958. The first elections since independence in 1956, they were supposed to be held in August 1957, but were postponed by the ruling council, who claimed that flooding would affect the vote. The result was a victory for the Umma Party, which won 63 of the 173 seats.

The Southern Sudan Federal Party competed in the election, and won 40 of the 46 seats allocated to the southern provinces.
The party platform represented a serious challenge to the authorities.
However, when it became clear that the party's demands for a federal structure would be ignored by the Constituent Assembly, on 16 June 1958 the southern MPs left parliament.

Results

House of Representatives

Senate

References

Sudan
Elections in Sudan
1958 in Sudan
National Legislature (Sudan)
Election and referendum articles with incomplete results